The McLaren C8 (sometimes referred to as the Chevrolet McLaren C) was a Group C racing car built on a M8F Trojan chassis.  The C8 used a  Chevrolet V8 engine. The car proved to be fragile, and it often retired from races. Peter Hoffmann owned the sole C8, and ran it until 1999. The body was from Lotec. A second body had been used by Lotterschmidt propelled by a BMW M1 engine on an unknown chassis.

Racing history

1980s
In 1982, Peter Hoffmann built this Group C in line with the new Group C regulations; he produced the C8 (Chevrolet McLaren C) which used a  Chevrolet V8 engine. He ran it for the first time in the eighth round of the Deutsche Rennsport Meisterschaft (DRM), held at Hockenheim; however, he retired. Hoffmann's effort in the next round, held again at Hockenheim, was similarly unsuccessful, as he retired after 26 laps. He then switched to the Interserie, and entered the sixth round of that series, held at Siegerland; he took second, finishing 39.1 seconds behind Volkert Merl's Porsche 908/3 Turbo. He then returned to the DRM for the tenth round, held at the Nürburgring, but retired once more. In conjunction with the races that Hoffmann had completed in the M8F, he was classified in joint-16th in the Interserie driver's standings with 15 points, level with Klaus Niedzwiedz.

In 1983, Hoffmann used the C8 from the start of the DRM season, and took eighth in the opening round, held at Zolder. However, he then retired from the next two rounds, held at Hockenheim and Mainz-Finthen, and was unable to start the Norisring round. An attempt to enter the second round of the Interserie, held at Most, was also unsuccessful, as he did not compete in the event. Hoffmann retained the C8 for 1984, but this year would be even more unsuccessful than 1983 had been. He retired from the first and third rounds of the Interserie, held at AVUS and the Nürburgring, and he missed several races altogether, before retiring in the Siegerland and the Nürburgring rounds. Having not used the C8 in 1985, Hoffmann entered it in the first round of the ADAC Sport Auto Supercup in 1986, held at the Nürburgring; but was the last of the finishers, in eleventh. He then retired at Hockenheim, Hoffmann would then switch back to the Holbert CAC-2 and M+H C1 that he had used earlier in the season.

1990s
Despite not having raced the McLaren C8 for six years, Hoffmann opted to run it in two rounds of the International Supersports Cup (ISC) in 1992, where he finished second at the Nürburgring, before struggling in the Silverstone round, being classified 36th. He entered three rounds of the series with the car in 1993, two rounds at the Nürburgring, and one at Paul Ricard; but he retired from all three. The C8 remained unused in 1994, and Hoffmann's attempt to run it at the Nürburgring round of the ISC in 1995 also ended in a retirement. Hoffmann entered five races of the ISC in 1996; he retired from the Monza, Spa and second Nürburgring rounds, failed to start the Donington Park round, but he took the car's first ever victory in the first Nürburgring round. Four failures to start followed in 1997, before Hoffmann took second at the Brno round. He would attempt to enter three races in 1998, and one in 1999, but didn't start any of the races, and the McLaren C8 never competed in a race again.

References

Group C cars
C8
Mid-engined cars
1980s cars
Rear-wheel-drive vehicles